Robert Goldsand (March 17, 1911September 16, 1991) was an Austrian-American classical pianist.

Life 

Goldsand was born in Vienna, Austria-Hungary, in 1911, the son of artisan Jakob Goldsand and his wife Helene. He began musical studies at age four on the violin, but discovery of his talent for the piano, and consequent concentration on that instrument, began within a year.  A student of Camella Horn, Joseph Marx, Emil von Sauer, and Moriz Rosenthal, Goldsand launched his performing career at age 10, in November 1921, with a concert in Vienna.  Thereafter, he engaged in European and South American tours.     His US debut came in 1927 at Town Hall in New York City.  His father Jakob died in 1929, and his mother Helene, who had accompanied Robert on several trips to the United States, died in 1937. Upon leaving Vienna to flee the Nazis — his parents were both Jewish — he settled in the United States in 1939, where he gave concerts and took a teaching position at the Cincinnati Conservatory.  In 1949, at the invitation of the Chopin Centennial Committee, he performed a complete cycle of that composer's recital repertoire in six concerts.  In 1951, Goldsand joined the faculty at the Manhattan School of Music , where he continued to teach until 1990.    In concert, his repertory ranged widely, embracing music ranging from J.S. Bach's Goldberg Variations through works of major 19th-century composers such as Beethoven, Liszt, Chopin, Schumann, and Schubert; virtuoso performer-composers like Godowsky and Schulz-Evler; and such 20th-century composers as Hindemith.

Pedagogy 

Goldsand taught many students during his long tenure at the  Manhattan School including Suezenne Fordham , Neil Galanter, Harris Goldsmith , Donald Isler, Anne Koscielny , Thomas Schumacher , and Ralph Votapek .  According to Henry Edmundson, a student for one year not long before Goldsand's death, Goldsand was "a stickler for tradition" and demanded that the student adhere to Goldsand's way of playing a piece.   Harris Goldsmith recalls Goldsand as a "pianistic charmer" with "debonair technical ease," citing an instance when Goldsand demonstrated with his left hand how to obtain the desired legato in the coda of Chopin's fourth ballade. 
Goldsand's passion for Beethoven had a major influence on his pupils, particularly in the case of Dr. Kevin Moore, a prominent professor of piano at Onondaga Community College in upstate New York. Dr. Moore has performed all 32 of Beethoven's piano sonatas, in local performances to the public, which have become immensely popular.

Recordings

Most of Goldsand's recordings appeared on the American Concert Hall Society label.  Later, Goldsand recorded for the American Desto and Decca labels.  Very few of these LP issues have reappeared on compact disc.

Death
He died of diabetes in a Danbury, Connecticut nursing home, in 1991.

References 
 Album notes to Franz Schubert: Sonata in A Major, opus 120; Moments Musicaux, Concert Hall Society CHS 1148, 12" mono LP
 Biographical sketch at International Piano Archives at Maryland. Retrieved 26 Jul 2013.
 Dubal, David, program notes for Nimbus Records, The New Golden Era—Vladimir Horowitz, Shura Cherkassky, Abram Chasins, Robert Goldsand
 Ivry, Benjamin, A Music Critic Performs, Practices What He Preaches, published in The New York Observer on September 10, 2006
 Koscielny, Anne, recitalist biography for Matthay Festival 2002 at Columbus State University, Columbus, Georgia
 Manhattan School of Music chronology
 Robert Goldsand, 80, Pianist and Teacher, obituary published in The New York Times on September 17, 1991
 Schumacher, Thomas, faculty biography at Eastman School of Music
 Votapek, Ralph, artist biography for Ivory Classics CD-72007 Ralph Votapek: Fire and Passion

External links
 Robert Goldsand (in German) from the Österreichische Mediathek

1911 births
1991 deaths
20th-century classical pianists
20th-century Austrian people
Austrian classical pianists
Austrian Jews
American classical pianists
American male classical pianists
Jewish classical pianists
Austrian emigrants to the United States
American people of Austrian-Jewish descent
Musicians from Vienna
Pupils of Joseph Marx
20th-century classical musicians
20th-century American pianists
20th-century American male musicians